St Mark's Academy is a mixed Church of England secondary school and sixth form located in the Eastfields area of the London Borough of Merton, England.

It was first established in 1960 as Eastfields High School for boys. The school became coeducational in 2002 and was renamed Mitcham Vale School. In 2006 the school was converted to academy status and was renamed St Mark's Academy. The academy is sponsored by Anthem Schools Trust and the Anglican Diocese of Southwark.

St Mark's Academy offers GCSEs, BTECs and OCR Nationals as programmes of study for pupils, while students in the sixth form have the option to study from  range of A Levels and additional BTECs. The school specialises in science and the performing arts, and has dedicated resources to support the specialisms.

The School has recently (October 2014) been awarded the prestigious International Values Quality Mark in recognition of its values-based ethos and character.

The academy's most famous former pupils include David Omoregie, a London grime and rap artist who performs under the name 'Dave'.

References

External links
St Mark's Academy official website

Secondary schools in the London Borough of Merton
Educational institutions established in 1960
1960 establishments in England
Church of England secondary schools in the Diocese of Southwark
Academies in the London Borough of Merton